Rob Chapman (born 1954) is an English music journalist and rock musician, best known as the vocalist for the defunct post-punk band the Glaxo Babies.

Biography 
He was the singer with the Bristol-based band the Glaxo Babies and with the British alternative rock band The Transmitters, a music journalist for Mojo and other magazines and newspapers, he made some broadcasting with the BBC National Network, wrote some books, including an acclaimed Syd Barrett biography, Syd Barrett: A Very Irregular Head (2010), and a rock-novel, Dusk Music (2008).

In 2007 he was appointed Senior Lecturer in Music Journalism at the University of Huddersfield.

Discography 
Vocals, with the Glaxo Babies
 This Is Your Life, EP, Heartbeat Records, 1979
 Christine Keeler, single, Heartbeat Records, 1979
 Various, Avon Calling – The Bristol Compilation, 33t, Heartbeat Records, 1979 ("It's Irrational"); 2×CD, Cherry Red, 2005 ("It's Irrational", "This Is Your Life", "Who Killed Bruce Lee?", "Christine Keeler", "Nova Bossa Nova")
 Various, Labels Unlimited – The Second Record Collection, 33t, Cherry Red, 1979. ("Who Killed Bruce Lee?")
 Peel session, 17/04/1979, BBC Radio One, diffusion 26/04/1979. ("It's Irrational", "Who Killed Bruce Lee?", "Burning", "She Went To Pieces").
 Put Me On The Guest List, LP, RTC/Heartbeat Records, 1980; CD, Birdsong/Hayabusa Landings (J), 2007
 Dreams Interrupted: The Bewilderbeat Years 1978–1980, CD-compilation, Cherry Red, 2006
 The Porlock Factor: Psych Dreams and Other Schemes 1985–1990, CD-compilation, Cherry Red, 2007

Vocals with The Transmitters
 And We Call That Leisure Time, LP, Heartbeat Records, 1981; CD, Birdsong (J), 2007
 Peel session, Transmitters, 22/07/1981, BBC Radio One, diffusion 29/07/198110. ("Joan Of Arc", "Love Factory", "Dance Craze", "Voodoo Woman In Death Plunge/ The Rent Girls Are Coming")

Bibliography 

 Rob Chapman, Psychedelia and Other Colours, Faber & Faber, 2015.  (Pop culture/history)
 Rob Chapman, Syd Barrett: A Very Irregular Head, Faber & Faber (UK), 2010.  / Da Capo Press (US), 2010.  (Biography)
 Rob Chapman, Dusk Music, Flambard Press, 2008.  (Novel)
 Rob Chapman, Album Covers From The Vinyl Junkyard, Booth-Clibborn Editions, 1997 et 2000.  (From a show at the Bluecoat Gallery, Liverpool, 1996.)
 Rob Chapman, Selling the Sixties: The Pirates and Pop Music Radio, Routledge, 1992.  (From his M.Phil in Mass Communications at the University of Leicester.)

Notes

External links
 
 Rob Chapman on Discogs

English male singers
1954 births
Living people
British post-punk musicians